Clara Pontoppidan (23 April 1883 – 22 January 1975), also known as Clara Wieth, was a Danish actress. She worked mainly in Swedish and Danish silent films, including A Victim of the Mormons (Denmark, 1911).

Personal life
Clara Pontoppidan was married to actor Carlo Wieth from 20 October 1906 until their divorce in 1917. She died in 1975, aged 91, in Copenhagen and is buried in Ordrup Cemetery.

Selected filmography
 Dorian Grays Portræt (1910)
 A Victim of the Mormons (1911)
 The Miracle (1913)
 The Clergyman (1914)
 A Good Girl Keeps Herself in Good Order (1914)
 Häxan (1922)
 En kvinde er overflødig (1957)

Awards
 1931 Ingenio et Arti gold medal
 1937 Tagea Brandt Rejselegat
 1958 Bodil Award for Best Actress in a Leading Role

References

External links 
 

1883 births
1975 deaths
Danish film actresses
Danish silent film actresses
20th-century Danish actresses
Actresses from Copenhagen
Best Actress Bodil Award winners
Recipients of Ingenio et Arti